There are about 450 known moth species of Mauritius. The moths (mostly nocturnal) and butterflies (mostly diurnal) together make up the taxonomic order Lepidoptera.

This is a list of moth species which have been recorded in Mauritius.

Arctiidae
Amerila vidua (Cramer, 1780)
Argina astrea (Drury, 1773)
Eilema squalida (Guenée, 1862)
Leucaloa infragyrea (Saalmüller, 1891)
Maculonaclia florida (de Joannis, 1906)
Nyctemera insulare (Boisduval, 1833)
Utetheisa cruentata (Butler, 1881)
Utetheisa elata (Fabricius, 1798)
Utetheisa pulchella (Linnaeus, 1758)
Utetheisa pulchelloides Hampson, 1907

Batrachedridae
Batrachedra arenosella (Walker, 1864)
Idioglossa bigemma Walsingham, 1881

Bedelliidae
Bedellia somnulentella (Zeller, 1847)

Choreutidae
Anthophila ialeura (Meyrick, 1912)
Anthophila turilega (Meyrick, 1924)
Brenthia leptocosma Meyrick, 1916
Tebenna micalis (Mann, 1857)

Copromorphidae
Copromorpha aeruginea Meyrick, 1917

Cosmopterigidae
Anatrachyntis coriacella (Snellen, 1901)
Anatrachyntis incertulella (Walker, 1864)
Anatrachyntis rileyi (Walsinham, 1882)
Cosmopterix attenuatella (Walker, 1864)
Cosmopterix dacryodes Meyrick, 1910
Eteobalea vinsoni (Viette, 1953)

Crambidae
Agathodes musivalis Guenée, 1854
Angustalius hapaliscus (Zeller, 1852)
Bocchoris inspersalis (Zeller, 1852)
Chilo sacchariphagus (Bojer, 1856)
Cirrhochrista nivea (de Joannis, 1932)
Cnaphalocrocis poeyalis (Boisduval, 1833)
Cnaphalocrocis trapezalis (Guenée, 1854)
Conocramboides seychellellus (T. B. Fletcher, 1910)
Cotachena smaragdina (Butler, 1875)
Crocidolomia pavonana (Fabricius, 1794)
Culladia achroellum (Mabille, 1900)
Culladia inconspicuellus (Snellen, 1872)
Diaphana indica (Saunders, 1851)
Eoophyla reunionalis  (Viette, 1988) 
Parapoynx fluctuosalis  (Zeller, 1852)
Eurrhyparodes bracteolalis (Zeller, 1852)
Glyphodes mascarenalis de Joannis, 1906
Glyphodes shafferorum Viette, 1987
Hellula undalis (Fabricius, 1781)
Herpetogramma phaeopteralis (Guenée, 1854)
Ischnurges lancinalis (Guenée, 1854)
Maruca vitrata (Fabricius, 1787)
Nausinoe geometralis (Guenée, 1854)
Nomophila noctuella ([Denis & Schiffermüller], 1775)
Notarcha quaternalis (Zeller, 1852)
Omiodes indicata (Fabricius, 1775)
Orphanostigma abruptalis (Walker, 1859)
Pagyda pulvereiumbralis (Hampson, 1918)
Palpita unionalis (Hübner, 1796)
Parapoynx diminutalis (Snellen, 1880)
Psara minoralis (Warren, 1892)
Pyrausta childrenalis (Boisduval, 1833)
Pyrausta pastrinalis (Guenée, 1862)
Pyrausta phaenicealis (Hübner, 1818)
Salbia haemorrhoidalis Guenée 1854
Scoparia benigna Meyrick, 1910
Spoladea recurvalis (Fabricius, 1775)
Stemorrhages sericea (Drury, 1773)
Udea ferrugalis (Hübner, 1796)
Zebronia phenice (Cramer, 1780)

Elachistidae
Orophia thesmophila (Meyrick, 1930)

Gelechiidae
Anarsia citromitra Meyrick, 1921
Anarsia vinsonella Viette, 1957
Bilobata subsecivella  (Zeller, 1852) 
Brachmia convolvuli Walsingham, 1907
Dichomeris acuminata (Staudinger, 1876)
Dichomeris hortulana (Meyrick, 1918)
Phthorimaea operculella (Zeller, 1873)
Sitotroga cerealella (Olivier, 1789)
Thiognatha mameti Viette, 1953
Thiotricha tenuis (Walsingham, 1891)

Geometridae
Ascotis antelmaria (Mabille, 1893)
Camelopteryx multicolor de Joannis, 1906
Casuariclystis latifascia (Walker, 1866)
Chloroclystis costicavata de Joannis, 1932
Chloroclystis derasata (Bastelberger, 1905)
Chloroclystis exilipicta de Joannis, 1906
Chloroclystis latifasciata de Joannis, 1932
Comostolopsis viridellaria (Mabille, 1898)
Darisodes orygaria (Guenée, 1862)
Disclisioprocta natalata (Walker, 1862)
Dithecodes purpuraria de Joannis, 1932
Ectropis distinctaria (de Joannis, 1915)
Ectropis herbuloti Orhant, 2003
Erastria madecassaria (Boisduval, 1833)
Gymnoscelis rubricata (de Joannis, 1932)
Hypomecis atrilunaria (Mabille, 1893)
Mimandria diospyrata (Boisduval, 1833)
Orthonama quadrisecta Herbulot, 1954
Pingasa hypoleucaria (Guenée, 1862)
Scopula caesaria (Walker, 1861)
Scopula minorata (Boisduval, 1833)
Thalassodes quadraria Guenée, 1857
Xanthorhoe eugraphata (de Joannis, 1915)

Glyphipterigidae
Glyphipterix ditiorana Walker, 1863

Gracillariidae
Acrocercops macrochalca Meyrick, 1910
Aspilapteryx pentaplaca (Meyrick, 1911)
Callicercops triceros (Meyrick, 1926)
Macarostola eugeniella (Viette, 1951)
Phodoryctis caerulea (Meyrick, 1912) 
Phodoryctis dolichophila (Vári, 1961)
Phyllocnistis citrella Stainton, 1856
Phyllonorycter trochetellus de Prins, 2012

Immidae
Imma infima Meyrick, 1930

Lyonetiidae
Lyonetia carcinota Meyrick, 1910

Noctuidae
Achaea catella Guenée, 1852
Achaea finita (Guenée, 1852)
Achaea infinita (Guenée, 1852)
Achaea lienardi (Boisduval, 1833)
Achaea trapezoides (Guenée, 1862)
Achaea umbrigera Mabille, 1898
Achaea violaceofascia (Saalmüller, 1891)
Agrotis ipsilon (Hufnagel, 1766)
Aletia consanguis (Guenée, 1852)
Aletia infrargyrea (Saalmüller, 1891)
Aletia pyrausta (Hampson, 1913)
Amyna axis Guenée, 1852
Anomis flava (Fabricius, 1775)
Anomis lophognatha Hampson, 1926
Anticarsia rubricans (Boisduval, 1833)
Araeopteron obliquifascia de Joannis, 1910
Argyrogramma signata (Fabricius, 1775)
Argyrolopha costibarbata Hampson, 1914
Asota borbonica (Boisduval, 1833)
Athetis ignava (Guenée, 1852)
Athetis pigra (Guenée, 1852)
Autoba costimacula (Saalmüller, 1880)
Brithys crini (Fabricius, 1775)
Callopistria cariei (de Joannis, 1915)
Callopistria maillardi (Guenée, 1862)
Catada obscura de Joannis, 1906
Cerynea tetramelanosticta Berio, 1954
Chalciope delta (Boisduval, 1833)
Chrysodeixis chalcites (Esper, 1789)
Condica pauperata (Walker, 1858)
Conservula cinisigna de Joannis, 1906
Corgatha terracotta de Joannis, 1910
Ctenoplusia dorfmeisteri (Felder & Rogenhofer, 1874)
Ctenoplusia limbirena (Guenée, 1852)
Cyligramma fluctuosa (Drury, 1773)
Cyligramma limacina (Guérin-Méneville, 1832)
Digama septempuncta Hampson, 1910
Diastema tigris Guenée 1854
Dysgonia angularis (Boisduval, 1833)
Dysgonia torrida (Guenée, 1852)
Erebus walkeri (Butler, 1875)
Ericeia congregata (Walker, 1858)
Ericeia congressa (Walker, 1858)
Eublemma cochylioides (Guenée, 1852)
Eublemmoides apicimacula (Mabille, 1880)
Eutelia blandiatrix (Guenée, 1852)
Eutelia discitriga Walker, 1865
Eutelia geraea Hampson, 1905
Gesonia obeditalis Walker, 1859
Gracilodes nysa Guenée, 1852
Grammodes bifasciata (Petagna, 1787)
Gyrtona polymorpha Hampson, 1905
Helicoverpa armigera (Hübner, [1808])
Hydrillodes bryophiloides (Butler, 1876)
Hypena conscitalis Walker, 1866
Hypena gravalis Mabille, 1898
Hypena hemiphaea de Joannis, 1915
Hypena laceratalis Walker, 1859
Hypena muscosoides Poole, 1989
Hypena obacerralis Walker, [1859]
Hypena varialis Walker, 1866
Janseodes melanospila (Guenée, 1852)
Leucania insulicola Guenée, 1852
Leucania nebulosa Hampson, 1902
Leucania phaea Hampson, 1902
Lophoruza mascarena de Joannis, 1910
Lophotavia incivilis Walker, 1865
Maxera marchalii (Boisduval, 1833)
Mocis conveniens (Walker, 1858)
Mocis frugalis (Fabricius, 1775)
Mocis mayeri (Boisduval, 1833)
Mocis proverai Zilli, 2000
Mythimna borbonensis Guillermet, 1996
Nagia linteola (Guenée, 1852)
Neostichtis ignorata Viette, 1958
Neostichtis nigricostata (Hampson, 1908)
Oedebasis longipalpis (Berio, 1959)
Ophiusa tirhaca (Cramer, 1777)
Oruza divisa (Walker, 1862)
Pericyma mendax (Walker, 1858)
Pericyma vinsonii (Guenée, 1862)
Polydesma umbricola Boisduval, 1833
Progonia oileusalis (Walker, 1859)
Prominea porrecta (Saalmüller, 1880)
Rhesala moestalis (Walker, 1866)
Rivula dispar de Joannis, 1915
Serrodes trispila (Mabille, 1890)
Sesamia calamistis Hampson, 1910
Simplicia extinctalis (Zeller, 1852)
Simplicia inflexalis Guenée, 1854
Spodoptera cilium Guenée, 1852
Spodoptera littoralis (Boisduval, 1833)
Spodoptera mauritia (Boisduval, 1833)
Thysanoplusia indicator (Walker, [1858])
Tolna sypnoides (Butler, 1878)
Trichoplusia orichalcea (Fabricius, 1775)
Trigonodes hyppasia (Cramer, 1779)
Vittaplusia vittata (Wallengren, 1856)

Nolidae
Earias biplaga Walker, 1866
Earias insulana (Boisduval, 1833)
Nola denauxi 
Nycteola mauritia (de Joannis, 1906)
Pardasena virgulana (Mabille, 1880)
Pardoxia graellsii (Feisthamel, 1837)

Oecophoridae
Ancylometis dilucida Meyrick, 1910
Ancylometis metacrocota Meyrick, 1930
Ancylometis phylotypa Meyrick, 1930
Ancylometis trigonodes Meyrick, 1887
Cenarchis capitolina Meyrick, 1924
Cenarchis celebrata Meyrick, 1924
Cenarchis liopsamma Meyrick, 1924
Cenarchis plectrophora Meyrick, 1924
Cenarchis priscata Meyrick, 1924
Cenarchis vesana Meyrick, 1924
Cenarchis veterata Meyrick, 1924
Epiphractis amphitricha Meyrick, 1910
Epiphractis tryphoxantha Meyrick, 1930
Hypercallia haematella Felder, 1875
Metachanda astrapias (Meyrick, 1887)
Metachanda baryscias Meyrick, 1930
Metachanda brachychlaena Meyrick, 1930
Metachanda declinata Meyrick, 1924
Metachanda drypsolitha Meyrick, 1930
Metachanda eophaea Meyrick, 1930
Metachanda fimbriata (Meyrick, 1910)
Metachanda gymnosopha Meyrick, 1930
Metachanda holombra Meyrick, 1930
Metachanda larochroa Meyrick, 1930
Metachanda malevola Meyrick, 1924
Metachanda oxyphrontis Meyrick, 1930
Metachanda ptilodoxa Meyrick, 1930
Metachanda sublevata Meyrick, 1924
Metachanda taphrospila Meyrick, 1930
Metachanda thaleropis Meyrick, 1911
Metachanda trisemanta Meyrick, 1930
Orygocera lenobapta Meyrick, 1924
Oxycrates fulvoradiella Legrand, 1966
Oxycrates longodivisella Legrand, 1966
Oxycrates xanthopeda Meyrick, 1930
Semnocosma necromantis Meyrick, 1924
Tanychastis lysigama Meyrick, 1910
Taragmarcha filicincta Meyrick, 1930
Taragmarcha glutinata Meyrick, 1930
Taragmarcha laqueata Meyrick, 1910

Plutellidae
Helenodes platyacma Meyrick, 1930
Plutella xylostella (Linnaeus, 1758)

Pterophoridae
Exelastis phlyctaenias Meyrick, 1911
Lantanophaga pusillidactylus (Walker, 1864)
Megalorhipida leucodactylus (Fabricius, 1794)
Oidaematophorus mauritius Gibeaux, 1994
Oxyptilus epidectis Meyrick, 1908
Platyptilia censoria Meyrick, 1910
Platyptilia fulva Bigot, 1964
Platyptilia molopias Meyrick, 1906
Platyptilia vinsoni Gibeaux, 1994
Sphenarches anisodactylus  (Walker, 1864)
Sphenarches caffer (Zeller, 1851)
Stenodacma wahlbergi (Zeller, 1852)
Stenoptilodes taprobanes (Felder & Rogenhofer, 1875)

Pyralidae

Chrysauginae
Parachma lequettealis Guillermet, 2011

Galleriinae
Corcyra cephalonica 
Lamoria clathrella (Ragonot, 1888)

Phycitinae
Cadra cautella  (Walker, 1863)
Cactoblastis cactorum (Berg, 1885)
Ceutholopha isidis  (ZELLER, 1867)
Etiella zinckenella 
Hypargyria metalliferella  Ragonot, 1888 
Hypsipyla grandella (Zeller, 1848)
Hypsipyla robusta (Moore, 1886)
Maliarpha separatella vectiferella 
Morosaphycita morosalis  (Saalmüller, 1880) 
Mussidia irisella (Guenée, 1862)
Pempelia strophocomma (de Joannis, 1932)
Phycita diaphana (Staudinger, 1870)
Phycita demidovi  Guillermet, 2007 
Spatulipalpia pectinatella de Joannis, 1915

Pyralinae
Hypotia saramitoi  (Guillermet, 1996)
Hypsopygia mauritialis (Boisduval, 1833)
Pyralis manihotalis 
Ocrasa nostralis  (Guenée, 1854)

Sphingidae
Acherontia atropos (Linnaeus, 1758)
Agrius convolvuli (Linnaeus, 1758)
Cephonodes apus (Boisduval, 1833)
Cephonodes trochilus (Guérin-Méneville, 1843)
Coelonia fulvinotata (Butler, 1875)
Coelonia solani (Boisduval, 1833)
Daphnis nerii (Linnaeus, 1758)
Euchloron megaera (Linnaeus, 1758)
Hippotion celerio (Linnaeus, 1758)
Hippotion eson (Cramer, 1779)
Macroglossum aesalon Mabille, 1879
Macroglossum milvus (Boisduval, 1833)
Macroglossum soror Rothschild & Jordan, 1903
Nephele oenopion (Hübner, [1824])

Thyrididae
Banisia clathrula (Guenée, 1877)
Hapana carcealis Whalley, 1971

Tineidae
Amphixystis aethalopis (Meyrick, 1930)
Amphixystis canthopa (Meyrick, 1924)
Amphixystis chrysodora (Meyrick, 1924)
Amphixystis crocinacma (Meyrick, 1930)
Amphixystis crypsirias (Meyrick, 1930)
Amphixystis fragosa (Meyrick, 1910)
Amphixystis hydrochalca (Meyrick, 1930)
Amphixystis pentacarpa (Meyrick, 1910)
Amphixystis sciadocoma (Meyrick, 1924)
Amphixystis serrata (Meyrick, 1914)
Amphixystis siccata (Meyrick, 1910)
Amphixystis spathistis (Meyrick, 1930)
Amphixystis syntricha (Meyrick, 1910)
Amphixystis trixysta (Meyrick, 1910)
Archyala pagetodes (Meyrick, 1911)
Erechthias zebrina (Butler, 1881)
Ogmocoma pharmacista Meyrick, 1924
Opogona autogama (Meyrick, 1911)
Opogona iridogramma Meyrick, 1924
Opogona omoscopa (Meyrick, 1893)
Opogona phaeochalca Meyrick, 1908
Opogona sacchari (Bojer, 1856)
Praeacedes despecta (Meyrick, 1919)
Protaphreutis antipyla Meyrick, 1930
Protaphreutis borboniella (Boisduval, 1833)
Protaphreutis brasmatias Meyrick, 1930
Protaphreutis cubitalis (Meyrick, 1910)
Protaphreutis leucopsamma Meyrick, 1930
Protaphreutis sauroderma Meyrick, 1930
Scalmatica malacista (Meyrick, 1924)
Setomorpha rutella Zeller, 1852
Tinea saltatrix Meyrick, 1930

Tortricidae
Adoxophyes ergatica Meyrick, 1911
Adoxophyes telestica Meyrick, 1930
Bactra stagnicolana Zeller, 1852
Bactra transvola Meyrick, 1924
Borboniella discruciata (Meyrick, 1930)
Borboniella rosacea Diakonoff, 1960
Brachiolia amblopis (Meyrick, 1911)
Brachiolia egenella (Walker, 1864)
Bubonoxena ephippias (Meyrick, 1907)
Coniostola calculosa (Meyrick, 1913)
Cosmetra spiculifera (Meyrick, 1913)
Cosmorrhyncha acrocosma (Meyrick, 1908)
Crocidosema plebejana Zeller, 1847
Cryptophlebia peltastica (Meyrick, 1921)
Cryptophlebia rhynchias (Meyrick, 1905)
Cryptophlebia semilunana (Saalmüller, 1880)
Cryptophlebia williamsi Bradley, 1953
Eccopsis incultana (Walker, 1863)
Grapholita atrana (Mabille, 1900)
Grapholita delineana Walker, 1863
Grapholita molesta (Busck, 1916)
Leguminivora anthracotis (Meyrick, 1913)
Lobesia embrithes Diakonoff, 1961
Lobesia oxypercna (Meyrick, 1930)
Mystogenes astatopa Meyrick, 1930
Olethreutes symmictopa (Meyrick, 1930)
Procrica sanidota (Meyrick, 1912)
Spilonota sinuosa Meyrick, 1917
Strepsicrates rhothia (Meyrick, 1910)
Tetramoera schistaceana (Snellen, 1891)
Thaumatotibia ecnomia (Diakonoff, 1974)
Thaumatotibia leucotreta (Meyrick, 1913)
Tortrix ochnotoma Meyrick, 1930

Uraniidae
Dirades theclata (Guenée, 1858)
Epiplema melanosticta de Joannis, 1915

Yponomeutidae
Xyrosaris obtorta Meyrick, 1924

References

External links 
 

Mauritius
Moths
Mauritius